 was a Japanese photographer famous for portraits of women, fashion photography, and nudes.

Matsushima was born on 5 January 1913 in Ushigome, Tokyo. He studied at Tōkyō Kōtō Kōgei Gakkō (later incorporated within Chiba University), where a fellow-student was Gen Ōtsuka. On graduating in 1933, he joined Jiji Shinpō-sha, but soon quit and moved to Nikkatsu, where he worked as a photographer, focusing especially on portraits of women, which he also submitted to Photo Times and other photographic magazines.

After the war Matsushima went freelance, working on portraits of women, fashion, and the like. In 1948 he created the group Shashinka Shūdan with Fujio Matsugi, Sankichi Ozaki and others. He continued to work prolifically after this.

Matsushima was an honorary member of the Japan Professional Photographers Society and the Japan Photographers Association.

Solo exhibitions

Dai ikkai Matsushima Susumu Josei Shashin-ten, 1952.
Matsushima Susumu Josei Shashin Kyōshitsu, 1969.

Publications

Josei satsuei no jissai (. Tokyo: Amiko Shuppansha, 1951. 
Josei-bi no utsushikata. 大泉書店, 1951. 
Young Lady Nude: 36 Sheets of Color.  三世新社, 1968. A portfolio.
(Joint work) Pōtrēto nūdo fotogurafi ). N.p. Matsushima Susumu Fotosutajio, 1979. 
Āto forumu: 70-nin no moderu ni yoru rafu-pōzu. Tokyo: Erute Shuppan, 1990. . 
Sutā pōtrēto-shū. 
Nūdo forumu.

Notes

References
Nihon no shashin: Uchinaru katachi, sotonaru katachi 1: Torai kara 1945 made / Japanese Photography: Form In/Out 1: From Its Introduction to 1945. Tokyo: Tokyo Metropolitan Museum of Photography, 1996.  Exhibition catalogue. Text and captions in Japanese and English.
Nihon shashinka jiten / 328 Outstanding Japanese Photographers. Kyoto: Tankōsha, 2000. .  Despite the English-language alternative title, all in Japanese.
Shashinka wa nani o hyōgen shita ka: 1945–1960 (What were photographers expressing? 1945–1960). Tokyo: Konica Plaza, 1991.  
Mention of Susumu Matsushima's death 

Fashion photographers
Japanese photographers
Portrait photographers
People from Tokyo
1913 births
2009 deaths
Chiba University alumni